Film tourism, or film induced tourism, is a specialized or niche form of tourism where visitors explore locations and destinations which have become popular due to their appearance in films and television series. The term also encompasses tours to production studios as well as movies or television-related parks. This is supported by several regression analyses that suggest a high correlation between destinations taking a proactive approach in order to encourage producers/studios to film at their location, and the tourism success in the area after the release of the movie. This is consistent with induced demand theory. When the supply increases, in the form of media exposure to areas that were not regarded as tourist hotspots, the number of visitors increases, even though the majority of these new visitors would not have necessarily visited these areas previously. This is exemplified by a Travelsat Competitive Index study that indicated that in 2017 alone, approximately 80 million tourists made the decision to travel to a destination based primarily on its feature in a television series or film. This figure has doubled since 2015.

Overview 
Film-induced tourism is one of the fastest-growing sectors in tourism currently. It emerged as a prominent form of tourism in the 1990s. Before its emergence as a unique driver of the tourism industry, there were brief mentions of the phenomenon of film tourism by academics and anecdotal mentions.

In 1996, the British Tourism Association became the first tourism agency to capitalize on film tourism by publishing a map of Great Britain with movie locations marked on it.

This increasing popularity of film tourism is due to the rise of international travel, the rapid growth of the entertainment industry, and cult-like celebrity status.

For destinations, films provide long-term tourism revenue. The appearance of a particular area in a film or television can have a huge effect on the number of visitors of an already existing place and create a new kind of tourism to the area and generate a boost for the local economy. On average, a film can increase tourism and revenue by almost 31%.

In New Zealand, fans of The Lord of The Rings movie series visit New Zealand, where most of the movie scenes were shot. The movies increased the annual tourist influx to New Zealand from US$1.7 million in 2000 to US$2.4 million in 2004, a 40 percent surge.

In Britain, the Alnwick Castle, where the scenes for the movie Harry Potter were shot had experienced a 120% increase in visitor numbers which brought an estimated £9 million worth tourist revenue to the area. One of the most prominent examples of film-induced demand is London King's Cross railway station, which was made famous for featuring a fictional section known as platform 9 3/4 in the Harry Potter movie series, first appearing in Harry Potter and the Philosopher's Stone. This fictional location was made into a real attraction in order to entice tourists to visit the train station, and a Harry Potter souvenir shop was constructed to capitalise on the increased interest in the series and the station.

Locations 
Notable movie and television series filming locations that have become popular tourist destinations because of that include:

See also 

 Pop-culture tourism, a related topic

References

Cultural tourism
Popular culture